The 2022 Portland City Commission elections were held on May 17, 2022, and November 8, 2022.

2 positions are up for election. Position 2 and Position 3 are held by Dan Ryan and Jo Ann Hardesty respectively who have both running for re-election.

Portland has no term-limits on officeholders.

Position 2 
Incumbent Dan Ryan has filed for re-election. Four other candidates have also filed to run for the seat and two additional candidates have filed but since withdrawn from the race.

Candidates 

 Dan Ryan, incumbent City Commissioner
 Sandeep Bali
 Chris Brummer
 Avraham Cox
 Steven Cox
 Michael Simpson, X-Ray technician and volunteer for AFL–CIO
 Renee Stephens
 Sophie Sumney-Koivisto, karaoke Host
 Alanna Joy "AJ" McCreary, founder and executive director of Equitable Giving Circle

Withdrawn 

 Jamila Aurora Dozier, Policy Coordinator at Portland Housing Bureau
 Brandon Farley

Results

Position 3 

Incumbent Jo Ann Hardesty filed for re-election. Seven other candidates have also filed to run for the seat, including Rene Gonzalez, a local attorney. Since no candidate received a majority of votes in the May primary election, Hardesty and Gonzalez, the top two vote-getters, both advanced to the November general election. Gonzalez won in November, with 52.59% of the vote (as of November 23, 2022), emphasizing law-and-order policies and promising to crack down on homelessness.

Candidates 

 Jo Ann Hardesty, incumbent City Commissioner
 Peggy Sue Owens, glass company administrator
 Vadim Mozyrsky, administrative law judge
 Rene Gonzalez, attorney
 Dale Hardt
 Chad Leisey, business owner and volunteer firefighter
 Jeffrey A. Wilebski, teacher and school administrator
 Karellen Stephens

Results

References

Government of Portland, Oregon
Portland, Oregon City Commission
Portland, Oregon City Commission